Shoghakat may also refer to:

 Shoghakat Church, Vagharshapat (Etchmiadzin), Armavir Province, Armenia
 Shoghakat Church of Tabriz, East Azerbaijan Province, Iran
 Shoghakat, Armenia, a village on Lake Sevan, Gegharkunik Province, Armenia 
 Shoghakat TV, an Armenian television channel based in Yerevan, Armenia